James Lukens McConaughy (October 21, 1887 – March 7, 1948) was an American politician and the 76th Governor of Connecticut.

Biography
McConaughy was born in New York on October 21, 1887. At Yale University, McConaughy was a member of Beta Theta Pi fraternity and completed his bachelor's degree in 1909. He completed his master's degree from Bowdoin College in 1911. He then completed his Ph.D. from Columbia University in 1913. He also completed another master's degree from Dartmouth College in 1915.  He taught English and education at Bowdoin College from 1909 to 1915. He married Elizabeth Townshend in 1913, and they had three children.  He was a professor of education at Dartmouth College from 1918 to 1925. He also was President of Knox College and Wesleyan University from 1925 to 1943.

Politics 
McConaughy was a Republican. He was the 85th Lieutenant Governor of Connecticut from 1939 to 1941. The following year, he served as president of the United China Relief Fund, and was civilian deputy of the Office of Strategic Service, serving from 1943 to 1945. He was an alternate delegate to Republican National Convention from Connecticut in 1944.

McConaughy won the 1946 Republican gubernatorial nomination, and was elected Connecticut's 76th governor. During his term, legislation was constituted that subsidized local bonds for housing construction. Twenty million dollars were granted for school construction that benefited rural areas more than larger cities. The state's first sales tax was initiated; unemployment benefits and old-age annuities were enhanced. In addition, a Fair Employment Practices Commission was founded, and a state bonus was instituted for World War II veterans.

Death
McConaughy died in Hartford, Connecticut, of coronary thrombosis on March 7, 1948, before finishing his term.

References

Further reading
 Sobel, Robert and John Raimo. Biographical Directory of the Governors of the United States, 1789-1978. Greenwood Press, 1988.

External links
The Political Graveyard
National Governors Association

Presidents of Wesleyan University
1887 births
1948 deaths
Bowdoin College alumni
Columbia University alumni
Dartmouth College alumni
Dartmouth College faculty
Republican Party governors of Connecticut
Lieutenant Governors of Connecticut
Yale University alumni
Knox College (Illinois)
Wesleyan University faculty
20th-century American politicians
20th-century American academics